Penn's thrush eel (Moringua penni) is an eel in the family Moringuidae (spaghetti/worm eels). It was described by Leonard Peter Schultz in 1953. It is a tropical, marine eel which is known from Papua New Guinea, in the western central Pacific Ocean.

References

Moringuidae
Fish described in 1953